Air Chief Marshal Sir Michael Wigston,  (born 25 February 1968) is the senior officer in the Royal Air Force, serving as Chief of the Air Staff since 26 July 2019. He previously served as Assistant Chief of the Air Staff from 2017 to 2018, and Deputy Commander (Personnel) and Air Member for Personnel and Capability from 2018 to 2019.

Early life and education
Wigston was born on 25 February 1968. He was educated at Friars School, a comprehensive school in Bangor, Wales. He studied engineering science at Oriel College, Oxford, graduating with a Bachelor of Arts (BA) degree in 1992: as per tradition, his BA was promoted to a Master of Arts (MA Oxon) degree. He later attended King's College London, graduating with an MA degree in defence studies in 2004.

RAF career
Wigston was commissioned into the Royal Air Force on 23 October 1986 on a university cadetship, with the rank of acting pilot officer. He was promoted to pilot officer on 15 July 1989, to flying officer on 15 January 1990, and to flight lieutenant on 15 January 1992. Flying the Tornado GR1 and GR4, he served successively with No. II(AC) Squadron, No. 14 Squadron, and No. 31 Squadron, before returning to No. II(AC).

He was promoted to squadron leader on 1 January 2000, and to wing commander on 1 July 2003. He was given command of No. 12 Squadron in 2005, and served as commander of No. 903 Expeditionary Air Wing during a deployment to Iraq in 2007. After assignments at the Ministry of Defence, he went on to be director of air operations at the International Security Assistance Force Headquarters in Afghanistan in 2011. He was Tornado Force Commander in 2013, and then principal staff officer to the Chief of the Defence Staff from 2013 to 2015. Wigston was appointed Commander of the Order of the British Empire (CBE) in recognition of his services in Afghanistan on 22 March 2013.

Wigston was promoted to air vice-marshal on 20 January 2015, and appointed Commander British Forces Cyprus and Sovereign Base Areas Administrator (SBAA). As SBAA, he conducted a same-sex marriage ceremony in October 2016. He became Assistant Chief of the Air Staff in March 2017 and, having been promoted to air marshal on 20 August 2018, he took up the post of Deputy Commander (Personnel) and Air Member for Personnel and Capability. Wigston handed over this appointment in May 2019.

Wigston was promoted to air chief marshal and become Chief of the Air Staff, the professional head of the RAF, in succession to Sir Stephen Hillier on 26 July 2019. Wigston was appointed Knight Commander of the Order of the Bath (KCB) in the 2020 Birthday Honours.

References

|-

|-

|-

1968 births
Alumni of King's College London
Alumni of Oriel College, Oxford 
Knights Commander of the Order of the Bath
Commanders of the Order of the British Empire
Living people
People educated at Friars School, Bangor
Royal Air Force air marshals
Royal Air Force personnel of the Iraq War
Royal Air Force personnel of the War in Afghanistan (2001–2021)
20th-century Royal Air Force personnel
21st-century Royal Air Force personnel